Ralph Emerson James Sr. (November 3, 1902 – April 13, 1981) was an American football and basketball coach. He served as the head football coach at Brevard College in Brevard, North Carolina (1932–1935), Western Carolina University (1936–1938), and High Point University (1945–1949).

James attended Wake Forest College—now known as Wake Forest University—where he played college football as a quarterback, college basketball as a forward, and college baseball. He died on April 13, 1981, in Asheville, North Carolina.

Head coaching record

College football

References

External links
 

1902 births
1981 deaths
American football quarterbacks
Forwards (basketball)
Brevard Tornados football coaches
High Point Panthers football coaches
High Point Panthers men's basketball coaches
Wake Forest Demon Deacons football players
Wake Forest Demon Deacons men's basketball players
Western Carolina Catamounts football coaches
Western Carolina Catamounts men's basketball coaches
College men's basketball head coaches in the United States
High school basketball coaches in North Carolina
High school football coaches in North Carolina
Sportspeople from Asheville, North Carolina
Coaches of American football from North Carolina
Players of American football from North Carolina
Baseball players from North Carolina
Basketball coaches from North Carolina
Basketball players from North Carolina